The Breckenridge 100 is an ultra-endurance mountain bike race held annually in mid July in Breckenridge, Colorado. 

At the same time the Breck 100 is being held, the organization offer three others options; solo 68 miles, solo 32 miles and a team relay. The race was part of the National Ultra Endurance Series until 2012 and will be again in 2017.   

The sprawling course is nestled between three ski resorts and features a distinct cloverleaf format of three loops that each begin and finish in Carter Park, adjacent to historic downtown Breckenridge.  The race crosses the Continental Divide of the Americas three times, once at Wheeler Pass at an elevation over 12,400 ft and twice at Boreas Pass at an elevation of 11,492 ft.  The course climbs a total of 13,719 feet, and includes backcountry trails, roads, double track, bike paths, and high mountain stream crossings.

Results

See also
 Wilderness 101 Mountain Bicycle Race
 Mohican MTB 100
 Shenandoah 100
 Lumberjack 100

External links
 Breckenridge 100 Home Page
 Summit Daily News coverage of 2005 event
 Cycling news results of 2005 event
 Calvin Mulder's race report on Warrior's Society

Mountain biking events in the United States
Endurance games
Cycle races in the United States
Recurring sporting events established in 2005
2005 establishments in Colorado
Cycling in Colorado